Horsethief Basin Lake is a reservoir in the Bradshaw Mountains and the Prescott National Forest, in central Arizona, United States. It is located near Crown King in eastern Yavapai County. Fish species present include Bluegill, Largemouth Bass, Channel Catfish, and Muskie.

Features
Horsethief Basin Resort began as a park facility of the City of Phoenix, built in 1936−1937 with assistance from the Public Works Administration (PWA) and Civilian Conservation Corps (CCC). In 1966 the city sold its interest in the resort buildings to private owners, and the area reverted to administration by the U.S. Forest Service as part of the Prescott National Forest.

The reservoir's dam is open to pedestrians and anglers. Boating is allowed on the lake.

Fish species
 Largemouth Bass
 Sunfish
 Channel Catfish (stocked)
 Tiger Musky (stocked)

References

External links
 Arizona Boating Locations Facilities Map
 

Reservoirs in Yavapai County, Arizona
Prescott National Forest
Historic American Buildings Survey in Arizona
Civilian Conservation Corps in Arizona
1937 establishments in Arizona